Ferric ammonium oxalate (ammonium ferrioxalate, ammonium tris(oxalato)ferrate) is the ammonium salt of the anionic trisoxalato coordination complex of iron(III).  It is a precursor to iron oxides, diverse coordination polymers, and Prussian Blue. The latter behavior is relevant to the manufacture of blueprint paper. Ferric ammonium oxalate has also been used in the synthesis of superconducting salts with bis(ethylene)dithiotetrathiafulvalene (BEDT-TTF), see Organic superconductor.

See also
 Potassium ferrioxalate

References

External links 
 http://www.chemblink.com/products/13268-42-3.htm
 http://chemicalland21.com/specialtychem/perchem/FERRIC%20AMMONIUM%20OXALATE.htm

Ammonium compounds
Iron(III) compounds
Oxalato complexes
Double salts